Pavel Složil and Sherwood Stewart were the defending champions, but Složil did not participate this year.  Stewart partnered Ferdi Taygan, losing in the first round.

Heinz Günthardt and Balázs Taróczy won the title, defeating Hans Simonsson and Mats Wilander 6–2, 6–4 in the final.

Seeds

  Kevin Curren /  Steve Denton (semifinals)
  Sherwood Stewart /  Ferdi Taygan (first round)
  Heinz Günthardt /  Balázs Taróczy (champions)
  Hans Gildemeister /  Cássio Motta (first round)

Draw

Draw

References
Draw

1983 Grand Prix (tennis)
Donnay Indoor Championships